The 2018 EurAsia Cup presented by DRB-HICOM was the third edition of the EurAsia Cup, a team golf event contested between teams representing Asia and Europe. It was held from 12–14 January at the Glenmarie Golf and Country Club in Shah Alam, Selangor, Malaysia. The team captains were Thomas Bjørn and Arjun Atwal.

The event had a $4,800,000 purse; $300,000 to each member of the winning team and $100,000 to each member of the losing team.

Europe won the match 14 to 10. Asia had held a narrow 6½ to 5½ lead at the start of the final day's singles session but Europe won 8 of the first 9 matches and retained the trophy.

Teams

OWGR as of 7 January.
Yellow background indicates a captain's pick.

The Asian team was selected as follows: the leading four available Asian players from the 2017 Asian Tour Order of Merit as of 27 November, the leading four eligible and available Asian players from the Official World Golf Ranking as of 27 November, and four captain’s picks. The leading four Asian players from the Asian Tour Order of Merit were Gavin Green (1), Shiv Chawrasia (4), Phachara Khongwatmai (5) and Poom Saksansin (6). The leading Asian players from the Official World Golf Ranking were Hideki Matsuyama (5), Yuta Ikeda (37), Kim Si-woo (40), Satoshi Kodaira (53), Li Haotong (57), Kiradech Aphibarnrat (59) and Anirban Lahiri (65). Matsuyama, Kim and Kodaira did not play. The captain's picks were Hideto Tanihara, Kang Sung-hoon, An Byeong-hun and Nicholas Fung.

OWGR as of 7 January.
Yellow background indicates a captain's pick.

The European team was selected as follows: the leading 10 available European players from the final 2017 European Tour Race to Dubai rankings plus two captain’s picks. The qualifiers from the Race to Dubai were Fleetwood (1), Hatton (5), Fisher (6), Cabrera-Bello (7), Norén (8), Fitzpatrick (12), Wiesberger (14), Stenson (15), Dunne (16),  and Pieters (20); Justin Rose (2), Jon Rahm (3), Sergio García (4), Francesco Molinari (9) and Rory McIlroy (13) chose not to participate. Lévy and Casey were chosen as captain picks.

Schedule
12 January (Friday) Four-ball x 6
13 January (Saturday) Foursomes x 6
14 January (Sunday) Singles x 12

Friday's matches (four-ball)

Saturday's matches (foursomes)

Sunday's matches (singles)

References

External links

Coverage on the European Tour's official site
Coverage on the Asian Tour's official site

EurAsia Cup
Golf tournaments in Malaysia
Eurasia Cup
Eurasia Cup
Eurasia Cup